Rasbora kobonensis is a species of ray-finned fish in the genus Rasbora. It is endemic to India.

References 

Rasboras
Freshwater fish of India
Taxa named by Banawari Lal Chaudhuri
Fish described in 1913